Donington Road railway station was a station in Lincolnshire on the line between Spalding and Sleaford.

In 2008 Hull Trains announced a plan in competition with National Express East Coast and East Midlands Trains to run direct trains from Grimsby and Lincoln to London. It proposed running trains via Sleaford, Spalding and Peterborough to London King's Cross. Part of the proposal was to reopen a station at Donington called Donington Parkway to serve the nearby town of Boston.

References

External links
 Donington Road station on navigable 1947 O. S. map

Disused railway stations in Lincolnshire
Former Great Northern and Great Eastern Joint Railway stations
Railway stations in Great Britain opened in 1882
Railway stations in Great Britain closed in 1961